The Bayswater Subway (or Bayswater Bridge) is a road under rail subway near Bayswater railway station in Perth, Australia with a low clearance of . It has become well known in Perth and has received significant media coverage for being frequently struck by tall vehicles.

The bridge was first proposed in 1898, but was not constructed until 1910, opening on February 14 of that year. The bridge was torn down in May 1969, due to its two lane width not being enough, and it was rebuilt with four lanes underneath. Bayswater railway station was rebuilt at the same time as an island platform as part of the conversion of the Midland line from narrow gauge to dual gauge.

In September 2014, flashing low clearance signs were put on the bridge. In May 2019, one of the low clearance signs fell off the bridge, landing on a vehicle and breaking its windscreen. Between when the Public Transport Authority started counting in 2014 and May 2019, the Bayswater Subway was struck by 36 vehicles.

, the bridge will be replaced by a  bridge as part of the rebuild of Bayswater railway station.

Despite being the best-known bridge in Perth for being hit, the Bayswater Subway is not the lowest road-under-rail bridge in Perth.

It is different from the historic railway bridge over the Swan River that existed between 1897 and 1957, which at times had been referred to as the "Bayswater Bridge".

See also 
 List of bridges known for strikes
 Montague Street Bridge
 Norfolk Southern–Gregson Street Overpass

References

External links
 

Bridges with frequent bridge strikes
Railway bridges in Perth, Western Australia
Bayswater, Western Australia
Bridges completed in 1910